Vicky Thompson (born 10 June 1971) is a British equestrian. She competed in two events at the 1996 Summer Olympics.

References

External links
 

1971 births
Living people
British female equestrians
British dressage riders
Olympic equestrians of Great Britain
Equestrians at the 1996 Summer Olympics
Sportspeople from Crawley